Vera Vasilyevna Baklanova (born 25 June 1947) is a former Soviet diver who won a gold medal in the 3 m springboard at the 1966 European Aquatics Championships. She competed in the same event at the 1964 and 1968 Summer Olympics and finished in 12th and 6th position, respectively.

References

1947 births
Living people
Soviet female divers
Russian female divers
Divers at the 1964 Summer Olympics
Divers at the 1968 Summer Olympics
Olympic divers of the Soviet Union